Per Evald Torbjörn Ohlsson (3 March 1958 – 27 October 2021) was a Swedish journalist and author.

Biography
Ohlsson studied at Lund University, where he also was editor of the student newspaper Lundagård from 1980 to 1981. He then worked as a journalist for the newspaper Expressen from 1982 to 1985. From 1985 to 1988 he was a correspondent in the United States for the newspaper Sydsvenska Dagbladet and from 1990 to 2005 he was political editor-in-chief at Sydsvenska Dagbladet (which classifies itself as "independently liberal"). From 2005 he was a senior columnist for the same newspaper.

Ohlsson published, among other books, a biography on the former Swedish Minister for Finance Johan August Gripenstedt (100 år av tillväxt : Johan August Gripenstedt och den liberala revolutionen, 1994) and on the Austrian-Swedish entrepreneur Herbert Felix (Konservkungen : Herbert Felix – ett flyktingöde i 1900-talets Europa, 2006). In 1998, he received the Söderberg Foundation Award for Journalism (Det Söderbergska Journalistpriset).

Bibliography

References

1958 births
2021 deaths
Writers from Malmö
Lund University alumni
20th-century Swedish journalists
Swedish non-fiction writers
21st-century Swedish journalists